Z Plan or Plan Z may refer to:

Military and political plans
Hypothesis Z, sometimes called Plan Z, the first Romanian plan for World War I
Plan Z, a plan for re-equipment and expansion of the Nazi German Navy ordered by Adolf Hitler in 1939
Operation Z, the Japanese code name for the 1941 Attack on Pearl Harbor in its planning stages
Operation Z (1944), the initial Japanese plan for the defense of the Marianas Islands in WWII
Z-4 Plan, a proposal to settle the Croatian War of Independence

Other
 Plan Z (TV series), a 1990s Chilean TV series
 Plan Z, a major plot element in The SpongeBob SquarePants Movie
 Z-plan castle, a form of castle design common in England and Scotland

See also
Project Z (disambiguation)